This article lists political parties in Grenada. Grenada has a two-party system, which means that there are two dominant political parties. For other parties it is extremely difficult to achieve substantial electoral success.

Active parties

Major parties

Third parties

Historical parties
Grenada National Party
Maurice Bishop Patriotic Movement
New Jewel Movement
People's Labour Movement
Good Old Democracy
United Republican Party
Christian Democratic Labour Party
Grenada Federated Labour Party

See also
 Politics of Grenada
 List of political parties by country

Grenada
 
Parties
Grenada
Political parties